Dubai Internet City is a rapid transit station on the Red Line of the Dubai Metro in Dubai, UAE, serving Barsha Heights and surrounding areas. The station is named after the nearby Dubai Internet City (DIC).

The station opened as part of the Red Line on 30 April 2010. It is close to the major junction with Hessa Street on the Sheikh Zayed Road. Nearby are the American School of Dubai, Dubai American Academy, and the International School of Choueifat. As well as Barsha Heights, surrounding neighbourhoods included Al Sufouh, the eponymous Dubai Internet City itself, Dubai Knowledge Park, Al Hawaii Residence, and Flamingo Villas. The station is close to a number of bus routes. The Palm Jumeirah Monorail serving Palm Jumeirah is close to the station and there are plans to link this to the Red Line.

References

Railway stations in the United Arab Emirates opened in 2010
Dubai Metro stations